Outdoor sculptures in the Netherlands

Curved Form (Bryher) is a bronze sculpture by Barbara Hepworth, modeled in 1961.
De Schreeuw 2007, a sculpture honoring Theo van Gogh (The Scream)
Elegy III (Hepworth) is an abstract bronze sculpture, by Barbara Hepworth
Exposure (sculpture) by artist Antony Gormley
Jardin d'émail by Jean Dubuffet, sculpture garden at Museum Kröller Müller 
Figure découpée l’Oiseau (1963) Vondelpark NL
Johnny Jordaanplein The square was named for a popular musician in the mid-1900s: Johnny Jordaan. There are bronze sculptures of Jordaan musical hall of fame. A statue of Johnny Jordaan was unveiled in 1991. There are sculptures of other performers: Tante Leen, Johnny Meyer, Manke Nelis and Jan & Mien in the square.
The Blue Violin Player In 1982 the sculpture of a human figure running with a violin case was installed in Amsterdam. The Blue Violin Player appears to be rushing toward the Bloemgracht tram stop, while carrying a violin case. 
Torentje van Drienerlo is a 1979 artwork by Dutch artist Wim T. Schippers, located on the campus of the University of Twente in Enschede

Gallery

References

Netherlands-related lists
Outdoor sculptures in the Netherlands